Yisrael Bar-Yehuda (15 November 1895 – 15 May 1965) was a Zionist activist and Israeli politician.

Biography

Born Yisrael Idelson in Konotop, in the Chernigov Governorate of the Russian Empire (present-day Sumy Oblast, Ukraine) in 1895, Bar-Yehuda attended an Academic High School and the Mine Engineering Institute in Ekaterinoslav. During that time he was the mathematics tutor of the future Lubavitcher Rebbe, when the later was 17 years old. 
In 1909 joined Tze'irei Zion (later to be merged into Hashomer Hatzair) and was made a member of its central committee in Russia in 1917. He was Secretary of the Central Committee of the “Socialist Zionists”, where he met and married Beba Idelson (whom he would later divorce). In 1922 they were arrested by the Soviet authorities and exiled to Siberia. In 1924, thanks to an intercession by Maxim Gorki's wife, their banishment was converted to deportation to Mandate Palestine. They traveled to Lithuania and from there to Berlin by way of Danzig. For the next two years in Berlin they were active in establishing the World Union of Socialist Zionists and became the Movement's Secretary.

In 1926 he immigrated to Palestine. He was Secretary of the Petah Tikva Workers Council and organized sentries to protect Jewish workers. He also did roadwork on the Tel Aviv-Petah Tikva road. In 1930 he joined kibbutz Yagur, and became its secretary six years later. During the 1936-39 Arab revolt he was among the first to call for "active defense".

He was a delegate to the Assembly of Representatives and a member of the Constituent Assembly. He was one of the leaders of the “B” faction in Mapai and one of the leaders of the Ahdut HaAvoda after the split in 1944. From 1960 to 1962 he was secretary general of Ahdut HaAvoda.

He was elected to the first and second Knessets for Mapam and for Ahdut HaAvoda to the third through fifth. He was a member of the House, Constitution, Law and Justice, Foreign Affairs & Defense, Constitution, Law and Justice, Labor, and Finance Committees, as well as Chairman of the Subcommittee for Basic Laws. Bar-Yehuda was also Deputy Speaker of the third Knesset. He was Minister of Internal Affairs from 1955 to 1962 and then Minister of Transportation until his death in 1965.

The Bar Yehuda Airfield was named after him, as is the road from Yagur to the HaKerayot intersection.

References

External links

1895 births
1965 deaths
Ahdut HaAvoda politicians
Deputy Speakers of the Knesset
Israeli Jews
Israeli people of Ukrainian-Jewish descent
Israeli trade unionists
Jewish Israeli politicians
Jewish socialists
Jews in Mandatory Palestine
Mapam politicians
Members of the Assembly of Representatives (Mandatory Palestine)
Members of the 1st Knesset (1949–1951)
Members of the 2nd Knesset (1951–1955)
Members of the 3rd Knesset (1955–1959)
Members of the 4th Knesset (1959–1961)
Members of the 5th Knesset (1961–1965)
Ministers of Internal Affairs of Israel
Ministers of Transport of Israel
People from Chernigov Governorate
People from Konotop
Soviet emigrants to Mandatory Palestine
Soviet Jews
Ukrainian Jews
Kibbutzniks
Russian exiles to Siberia
Soviet expellees
Ukrainian Zionists
Zionist activists